The 1989–90 Dallas Sidekicks season was the sixth season of the Dallas Sidekicks indoor soccer club. The season saw the team win their first division title in franchise history and make the playoffs for the fifth consecutive year. Not only was the team the best in the Western Division, it was the only team above .500. However, they were shockingly upset in the Division Finals by the eventual champion San Diego Sockers, the second consecutive year they eliminated the Sidekicks. On January 25, the team hosted the “Australian Select,” Australia’s best players in indoor soccer. The Sidekicks defeated them 7–3. The team’s 31 regular season wins were the most in a single season in franchise history.

Roster

Schedule and results

Preseason

Regular season

Postseason

Final standings

y – division champions, x – clinched playoff berth

External links
 1989–90 Dallas Sidekicks season statistics at Kicks Fan fansite

Dallas Sidekicks (1984–2004) seasons
Dallas Sidekicks
Dallas Sidekicks